Wendelin Joseph Nold (January 18, 1900 – October 1, 1981) was an American prelate of the Roman Catholic Church. He served as bishop of the Diocese of Galveston-Houston in Texas from 1950 to 1975.

Biography

Early life 
Wendelin Nold was born in Bonham, Texas, to Wendelin Joseph and Mary Elizabeth (née Charles) Nold. After attending parochial schools in Cleburne and Fort Worth, he studied at St. Mary's Seminary in La Porte, from where he obtained a Bachelor of Arts degree in 1921. He then furthered his studies at the Pontifical North American College in Rome, and there earned a doctorate in sacred theology in 1925.

Priesthood 
While in Rome, Nold was ordained to the priesthood for the Diocese of Dallas on April 11, 1925. Upon his return to Texas, Nold served as a curate at Sacred Heart Cathedral Parish  in Dallas, and became the first pastor of Christ the King Parish in Dallas in 1941. In addition to his pastoral duties, he also served in the chancery as a consultor, synodal judge, synodal examiner, director of the Confraternity of Christian Doctrine, and director of Catholic Action. He was raised to the ranks of papal chamberlain in 1936, domestic prelate in 1942, and prothonotary apostolic in 1946.

Coadjutor Bishop and Bishop of Galveston-Houston 
On November 29, 1947, Nold was appointed coadjutor bishop of what was then the Diocese of Galveston and titular bishop of Sasima by Pope Pius XII. He received his episcopal consecration on February 25, 1948 from Bishop Joseph Lynch, with Bishops Christopher Byrne and Augustine Danglmayr serving as co-consecrators. After the death of Bishop Byrne on April 1, 1950, Nold automatically became the fifth bishop of Galveston. He was the first native Texan to hold that office.

Due to the tremendous growth in the City of Houston, the Vatican allowed Nold in 1959 to designate Sacred Heart Church in Houston as a co-cathedral. The diocese now had two cathedrals: Sacred Heart Cathedral in Houston and St. Mary's Cathedral Basilica in Galveston. The Vatican renamed the diocese as the Diocese of Galveston-Houston on July 25, 1959.

In 1959, Nold suffered a heart attack.  Around that same time, he started suffering from kidney disease. In September 1961, Nold ordered that all Catholic schools in the diocese be racially integrated.  During a hospitalization in 1963, he went blind. Later that year the Vatican appointed Bishop John Morkovsky in 1963 as coadjutor bishop, in charge of administering the diocese. Nold attended the Second Vatican Council from 1962 to 1965. During his tenure he established forty-seven parishes and fourteen missions, as well as several schools.

Retirement and legacy 
On April 22, 1975, Pope Paul VI accepted Nold's resignation as bishop of the Diocese of Galveston-Houston. Nold died in Houston on October 1, 1981, at age 81.

See also

References

External links
 Nold, Bishop Wendelin and David Courtwright. Bishop Wendelin Nold Oral History, Houston Oral History Project, August 20, 1975.
Roman Catholic Archdiocese of Galveston–Houston

1900 births
1981 deaths
People from Bonham, Texas
Participants in the Second Vatican Council
Roman Catholic bishops of Galveston–Houston
20th-century Roman Catholic bishops in the United States